Irene Sutcliffe (12 July 1924 – 3 May 2019) was an English actress. She was best known for playing Maggie Clegg in ITV's Coronation Street, a role she played from 1968 until 1975. She had a long career; her first credited TV role was in 1953 on BBC's Sunday Night Theatre and her last in 2015.

Early life
Sutcliffe was born and brought up in Burnley, Lancashire, during her early life. Her father, Fred Sutcliffe, was an ironmonger. She trained at LAMDA.

Death
Sutcliffe died on 3 May 2019, aged 94.

Credits

Television
The Royals (2015) as The King's Mother
Doctors (2010) as Joan Woolf in the Episode "The Tiptoe of Expectation" (Season 12, Episode 33)
Doc Martin (2007) as Janet in the episode "Nowt So Queer"
Hetty Wainthropp Investigates (1997) as Helen Rance in  the episode "Woman Of The Year" (Season 2, Episode 6)
She's Out (1995) Mrs Simms
Miss Marple (1987) as Miss Gorringe in the Episode "At Bertram's Hotel" (Episode 7)
All Creatures Great & Small (1989) as Sister Rose in the Episode "The New World" (Season 6, Episode 7)
Morse (season1, Episode 1) as Mrs Hornsby (6/1/1987)
Juliet Bravo (1984) as Mrs Williams in the Episode "Getting Away With It" (Season 5, Episode 4)
((Dark Green by Rose Tremaine)) (1975) BBC Radio 4 Play  
Coronation Street  (1968–1974, 1975) as Maggie Clegg / Cooke, Series Regular
Emergency Ward Ten (1966) as Night Sister
Sunday Night Theatre (1953) as Desdemona in the Episode "Will Shakespeare"

Film
Withnail & I (1987) as Mabs Blennerhassit (Waitress)

Radio
Death on the Nile (BBC Radio 4 adaptation) (1997) as Mrs Van Shuyler

Stage

References

External links
 

1924 births
2019 deaths
English television actresses
English soap opera actresses
People from Burnley
Actresses from Lancashire
Alumni of the London Academy of Music and Dramatic Art